Suzette Severo Doctolero (born December 16, 1968) is a Filipina screenwriter for film and television.  She is best known for being the creator of Encantadia in 2005 and the succeeding related television series including the Encantadia 2016 reboot.  She is mostly credited as screenwriter, series creator and creative consultant for GMA Network. Her other works include Amaya, Indio and My Husband's Lover. She also wrote the story for the film Let the Love Begin and became the creative consultant for the television series Alyas Robin Hood and Destined to be Yours.

Biography
Suzette Severo Doctolero was raised in Calabanga, Camarines Sur and she is the granddaughter of Buenviges Narvadez, a Filipino comedienne and actress in the 1930s.  She studied high school at José Rizal College (which later became José Rizal University) and went to college at the Polytechnic University of the Philippines (PUP) on different courses.  She first took an accounting course, then clinical psychology and lastly bachelor of arts in Filipino. When she was in PUP, she joined theater groups Dulaang Kalayaan and Dulaang Bonificacio where she portrayed Gregoria de Jesus in one of the plays.

At age of 19 in 1988, Doctolero's adviser, Angie Ferro, hired her as production assistant for Balintataw TV. After her stint at Balintataw TV, she tried to write romantic novels and with the help of Lualhati Bautista, her work entitled Ako si Alex, Babae (I'm Alex, a Woman) was published by Anvil Publishing.  In the 1990s, Doctolero ventured in selling her works to different publishers, head writers, editors and producers.  She also contributed to the story writing of Viva Television shows.

In the later part of her career, Doctolero became a screenwriter for television series of GMA Network.  She is one of the writers of Kirara, Ano Ang Kulay ng Pag-ibig? and Sana Ay Ikaw Na Nga. Encantadia is her very first project as head writer and her first work in the telefantasya genre, which she created for GMA Network.  Her other credited works for GMA Network include Amaya, Indio and My Husband's Lover.  She also wrote the script for some of the episodes of Daisy Siete, which was produced by Focus Entertainment and shown also in GMA Network.  She also wrote scripts for the television adaptation of Lupin, Joaquin Bordado, Totoy Bato, Gagambino and Panday Kids but most of these series did not get high ratings, thus, she no longer wrote adaptations.  For her film credits, she wrote the screenplay for Let the Love Begin and Bahay Kubo: A Pinoy Mano Po!.

In 2016, Doctolero became the creative consultant for GMA Network's Alyas Robin Hood, which tells the story about Jose Paulo "Pepe" de Jesus who is a lawyer being accused of killing her father and then he faked his death to become the vigilante with a bow and arrow.  Many netizens pointed out that Alyas Robin Hood has some similarities with Arrow by The CW. Stephen Amell who portrays the title character Oliver Queen/Green Arrow in Arrow also commented about Alyas Robin Hood through a Facebook post.  Doctolero defended the show and she said that Alyas Robin Hood is based on the legend of Robin Hood, an English folklore, and not based on Arrow.  She also further explained that the story of Robin Hood is already under public domain and it has been used as master plot by many writers.  She also mentioned that there was a similar case in 2007 when she wrote the television adaptation of Lupin.  Writers of the earlier adaptations of Lupin in Japan sent a demand letter to GMA Network but the writers did not win because Lupin is based on a French character created by Maurice Leblanc, which is already in public domain.

Doctolero was also the creative consultant of Destined to be Yours in 2017, headlined by Alden Richards and Maine Mendoza (collectively known as AlDub), which was their first prime time series. In April 2017, Doctolero commented on Twitter about the series saying that the first weeks of Destined to be Yours were flop or did not rate well but it later had good ratings after changing the direction of the story.  AlDub fans and other netizens had mixed reactions on her social media posts.  This prompted GMA Network's Senior Vice President for Entertainment TV Lilybeth Rasonable to release an official statement regarding the show.  According to Rasonable, Destined to be Yours received higher ratings against the competition since the pilot episode until the posting of her official statement and Doctolero tweets are her own personal opinions and do not reflect the stand of GMA Network.

Filmography

Television
 2023  Voltes V: Legacy  (as head writer) 
 2022  Maria Clara at Ibarra (as head writer) 
 2021 Legal Wives  (as head writer/creator)
 2019 Sahaya (as head writer)
 2019 Bihag (as creator)
 2018-2019 Cain at Abel (as creator)
 2018-2019 Ika-5 Utos (as creator)
 2018 Hindi Ko Kayang Iwan Ka (as head writer)
 2017 Kambal, Karibal (as creative consultant)
 2017 Destined to be Yours (as creative consultant)
 2016 Alyas Robinhood  (as creative consultant)
 2016 Encantadia (remake) (as head writer) 
 2016 Poor Señorita (as creative head) 
 2015 My Faithful Husband (as head writer)
 2015 Healing Hearts (as creative head)
 2015 The Rich Man's Daughter (as creator, head writer)
 2014 Ang Dalawang Mrs. Real (as creative consultant)
 2014 Carmela (as creator, head writer)
 2013 Kahit Nasaan Ka Man (as creator, head writer)
 2013 Akin Pa Rin ang Bukas (as creative consultant)
 2013 My Husband's Lover (as creator, head writer)
 2013 Mundo Mo'y Akin (as creative consultant)
 2013 Indio (as creator, head writer)
 2012 Pahiram ng Sandali (as creator, creative consultant)
 2012 Sana Ay Ikaw Na Nga (as co-brainstormer)
 2012 One True Love (as creator, head writer)
 2012 Hiram na Puso (as creator, head writer)
 2011 Amaya (as creator, head writer)
 2011 My Lover, My Wife (as head writer)
 2009 Ikaw Sana (as head writer)
 2009 Totoy Bato (as head writer)
 2008 Gagambino (as head writer)
 2008 Joaquin Bordado (as head writer)
 2007 Kamandag (as writer)
 2007 La Vendetta (as writer)
 2007 Pasan Ko Ang Daigdig (as writer)
 2007 Impostora (as writer)
 2007 Lupin (as head writer)
 2006 Daisy Siete (as head writer)
 2006 Bakekang (as writer)
 2006 Encantadia: Pag-ibig Hanggang Wakas (as creator, head writer)
 2005 Etheria (as creator, head writer)
 2005 Encantadia (as creator, head writer)
 2004 Forever in My Heart (as writer)
 2004 Te Amo, Maging Sino Ka Man (as writer)
 2000 May Bukas Pa (as writer)
 1996 Tierra Sangre (as writer)

Film
 2008 My Bestfriend's Girlfriend (screenplay)
 2007 Bahay Kubo (as screenplay)
 2006 I Will Always Love You (story and screenplay)
 2005 Lovestruck (screenplay)
 2005 Let the Love Begin (screenplay)
 1999 Hubad Sa Ilalim ng Buwan (story)

References

External links
 

Filipino dramatists and playwrights
Filipino screenwriters
1968 births
Living people
Women dramatists and playwrights
Women screenwriters
Constructed language creators
GMA Network (company) people
20th-century dramatists and playwrights
21st-century dramatists and playwrights
20th-century Filipino writers
21st-century Filipino writers
20th-century Filipino women writers
21st-century Filipino women writers
Encantadia